The Ameca shiner (Notropis amecae) is a species of cyprinid fish in the family Cyprinidae. The Ameca shiner was described in 1986 from upper parts of the Ameca River drainage in Jalisco, Mexico. Although already feared extinct by 1969, and listed as such by the IUCN when rated in 1996, a tiny population was rediscovered in 2001. Some were brought into captivity to form the basis of a breeding program. These have been used for a reintroduction project since 2015.

Its closest relatives are the yellow shiner and the Durango shiner.

References

Sources 
 

Notropis
Endemic fish of Mexico
Freshwater fish of Mexico
Cyprinid fish of North America
Fish described in 1986
Taxonomy articles created by Polbot